Hartsholme Country Park lies about  southwest of the city centre of Lincoln in the East Midlands of England. Access is from the Skellingthorpe Road (B1378).

It contains a camping area for tents, caravans and motor caravans. It is  Grade II listed.

The Park centres on lakes and ornamental grounds originally the work of Edward Milnerin 1862, landscaping the area around a reservoir of 1848.  They were built along with a home, Hartsholme Hall, which was demolished in 1951, around the time the grounds became a public park.

In July 2012 the White Bridge was closed, and the deck removed in September, for safety reasons.   This was a footbridge built in 1962, on the pylons of the earlier 1902 bridge.  Closure interrupts a public right-of-way across the lake. A replacement bridge using the original 1902 supports reopened on 7 March 2014.

Hartsholme Park has often been awarded a Green Flag Award, including in 2011  and 2013. These are awarded annually by the charity Keep Britain Tidy.

The park opened to the public in 1978

References

External links

Description
Photos of park and Hartsholme Electric Model Boat Club

Country parks in Lincolnshire
Lincoln, England